Following the Feeling is the 14th album by country singer Moe Bandy, released in 1980 on the Columbia label.

Track listing
"Following The Feeling*" (Charlie Craig) - 2:54
"Today I Almost Stopped Loving You" (Dan Mitchell) - 2:32
"Would You Mind If I Just Call You Julie" (Warren Robb, Shirl Milete) - 2:56
"Mexico Winter" (Buck Moore, Jim Mundy) - 2:55
"Liquor Emotion" (Moe Bandy, R. Hill) - 2:49
"My Woman Loves The Devil Out of Me" (B. P. Barker) - 2:45
"It's You And Me Again*" (D. Mitchell, J. McCollum) - 2:25
"I've Got Your Love All Over Me" (M. Lane) - 2:30
"If I Lay Down The Bottle, Would You Lay Back Down With Me" (Warren Robb, Dave Kirby) - 3:16
"It's Better Than Being Alone" (E. Penney) - 2:36

* Featuring Judy Bailey

Musicians
Bob Moore
Kenny Malone
Buddy Harman
Leo Jackson
Ray Edenton
Chip Young
Weldon Myrick
Jimmy Capps
Pete Wade
Charlie McCoy
Johnny Gimble
Hargus "Pig" Robbins
Tommy Allsup
Henry Strzelecki
Dave Kirby
Leon Rhodes
Bob Wray
Ricky Skaggs

Backing
The Jordanaires with Laverna Moore
The Nashville Edition

Production
Sound engineers - Ron Reynolds, Billy Sherrill, Lou Bradley
Photography - Alan Messer
Art direction & design - Virginia Team & Bill Johnson

1980 albums
Moe Bandy albums
Columbia Records albums
Albums produced by Ray Baker (music producer)